Ray Mitchell Agnew III (born February 26, 1991) is an American football executive and former fullback who is a pro scout for the New York Jets of the National Football League (NFL).

He played college football at Southern Illinois University and signed as an undrafted free agent by the Cleveland Browns in 2014.

Early years
Agnew was born on February 26, 1991, in Winston-Salem, North Carolina. He played high school football for the De Smet Jesuit High School Spartans. He was a three-year starter at running back and two-year starter at linebacker. He was a two-time first-team all-Metro Catholic Conference selection. Agnew also excelled in track & field, recording a top-throw of 14.78 meters (48 ft, 3 in) in the shot put at the 2009 MSHSAA Class 4 District 2, where he placed 3rd.

Playing career

College
Agnew played from 2010 to 2013 for the Southern Illinois Salukis. He was redshirted in 2009.

National Football League

Cleveland Browns
Agnew was signed by the Cleveland Browns on May 12, 2014, after going undrafted in the 2014 NFL Draft. He made his NFL Debut on September 7, 2014, against the Pittsburgh Steelers, recording two rushing yards on one rushing attempt.

He was waived by the Browns on October 20, 2014 and re-signed by the team on November 11, 2014.

He was released by the Browns on December 23, 2014.

Dallas Cowboys
Agnew signed with the Dallas Cowboys on March 13, 2015. He was released by the Cowboys on September 5, 2015.

Washington Redskins
The Washington Redskins signed Agnew to their practice squad on September 7, 2015. He was released by the Redskins on September 15, 2015.

Executive career

New York Jets
Following his playing career, Agnew joined the New York Jets as a seasonal personnel assistant. In 2019, he was hired full-time by the Jets to serve as a pro scout in their scouting department.

Personal life
Agnew and his fiancé now reside in New Jersey. Agnew is the son of Ray Agnew, the assistant general manager of the Detroit Lions and former defensive tackle who played for eleven seasons in the NFL and has two brothers that are also involved in football, Malcolm, who serves as the running backs coach at Sacramento State, and Keenan, a defensive tackle at Southern Illinois.

References

External links

 New York Jets profile
Washington Redskins profile
 Southern Illinois Salukis profile
NFL Draft Scout

Living people
1991 births
Players of American football from Winston-Salem, North Carolina
Players of American football from Missouri
American football fullbacks
African-American players of American football
Southern Illinois Salukis football players
Cleveland Browns players
Dallas Cowboys players
Washington Redskins players
People from Chesterfield, Missouri
New York Jets scouts
New York Jets executives
21st-century African-American sportspeople